Ricky Lynn Phillips (born October 7, 1952) is an American bass guitarist and a member of the rock band Styx since 2003, splitting duties with longtime bassist Chuck Panozzo. He has also played in Nasty Habit, as a member of The Babys and Bad English, and with Coverdale-Page and Ted Nugent.

Phillips and his former Bad English bandmate Neal Schon also played with former Montrose members Sammy Hagar and Denny Carmassi on a live version of the Montrose song "Rock Candy".

Discography

With The Babys
 Union Jacks
 On The Edge

With Bad English
 Bad English
 Backlash

With Styx
 Big Bang Theory
 One with Everything: Styx and the Contemporary Youth Orchestra
 The Mission
 Crash of the Crown

With Ronnie Montrose
 10x10 - Producer, Bass, Hammond organ, Lead and Backing Vocals, Guitar

With Coverdale/Page
 Coverdale/Page

References

External links

Official website
The Babys Official Unofficial Archives and Chronological History
Career Retrospective Interview from April 2016 with Pods & Sods

Living people
American rock bass guitarists
American male bass guitarists
Bad English members
The Babys members
1952 births
Styx (band) members
Angel (band) members
20th-century American guitarists
Ted Nugent Band members